Hermes is a fictional character appearing in American comic books published by Marvel Comics. Hermes is the Olympian God of transitions and boundaries in Greek religion and mythology. Hermes first appeared in Thor #129 and was adapted by Stan Lee and Jack Kirby.

Fictional character biography
Hermes is the herald of Zeus in the Olympian pantheon, and is also the god of commerce, travel, and thieves. Zeus is Hermes's father. Hermes was born to the nymph Maia on Mount Cyllene, Arcadia, in ancient Greece.

When Hermes first appeared, he was seen departing Olympus on an unknown mission. Alongside his fellow Olympians, he attacked the Eternals at the behest of Zeus and Odin. During this fight, Hermes battled Makkari. Hermes's role as the messenger of the goddesses involved in the creation of the Young Gods was later revealed. He was also present when Zeus granted power to Thor to help resurrect the Asgardian gods. Hermes next appointed Jules Keene the god of luck.

When Hercules was gravely wounded fighting the Masters of Evil, Hermes abducted the injured Hercules from the New York hospital he was admitted to. Zeus blamed the Avengers for Hercules's condition, and ordered the Olympians to attack the Avengers. Hermes battled the Avengers at Zeus's behest, but was then forbidden to set foot on Earth by Zeus. Some time later, Hermes brought Cupid a message from Venus. Later Hermes brought a message to Ares to try to convince him to return to Olympus during the attack by the Japanese God of Evil Amatsu-Mikaboshi.

Following the Fear Itself storyline, Hermes comes in on Zeus (who is in the form of Storm in his latest mating with mortal women) telling him that Hercules had broken into Ares' weapons stockade and taken some of the weapons there.

Powers and abilities
Hermes possesses the typical powers of an Olympian; superhuman strength, durability, stamina, agility, and reflexes. He is immortal as well as resistant to all terrestrial diseases. Hermes can run and fly at speeds exceeding those of any other Olympian god or goddess.

Hermes is an extraordinary hand-to-hand combatant, especially at wrestling. He is also an expert thief, skilled musician, and is adept at any pursuit requiring swiftness and dexterity.

Hermes is usually armed with a short sword, forged by Hephaestus. His half-brother Apollo also created a caduceus for him, a magical device capable of controlling lesser beings, conducting ghosts, and turning objects into gold.

Reception
 In 2018, CBR.com ranked Hermes 18th in their "25 Fastest Characters In The Marvel Universe" list.
 In 2022, Screen Rant included Hermes in their "10 Most Powerful Olympian Gods In Marvel Comics" list.
 In 2022, CBR.com ranked Hermes 2nd in their "Marvel: The 20 Fastest Speedsters" list.

Other versions
In one alternate future, depicted in Hercules vol. 2 #1-4, Hermes and the other Olympians leave Olympus in the 23rd century, leaving Hercules there to father a new race of gods.

References

External links
 

Characters created by Jack Kirby
Characters created by Stan Lee
Classical mythology in Marvel Comics
Comics characters introduced in 1966
Fictional characters with superhuman durability or invulnerability
Fictional gods
Fictional musicians
Fictional sport wrestlers
Greek and Roman deities in fiction
Hermes
Marvel Comics characters who can move at superhuman speeds
Marvel Comics characters with superhuman strength
Marvel Comics martial artists